The Robb Nash Project is a Canadian rock band from Winnipeg, Manitoba.

History
Musician Bobby Reimer grew up in the Mennonite farming community of Kleefeld, Manitoba. While still in high school, he suffered major head injuries in an automobile accident. Surviving the crash impacted Reimer to become a musician and motivational speaker. Reimer adopted the stage name Robb Nash and formed the band I Witness, which released a number of singles in the early 2000s. He later changed the name of the band to Live On Arrival as a reference to his accident.

Live on Arrival
Nash formed Live on Arrival with Bobby McKay (guitar), Jonny Holiday (drums), Lenard Penner (bass), and Matt Cairns (guitar). The band released a number of singles in 2007 and 2008 including "Hello Goodbye", "Ready Set Go", and "Wanna Be." They toured with Hedley, Finger Eleven, Buckcherry and others. In 2007, Nash began performing in Canadian high schools as a motivational speaker and musician. The band has played over 1000 shows, including We Day alongside Lights, Hedley, Marianas Trench and speakers such as Larry King and Martin Sheen.

The band is currently known as the Robb Nash Project. In 2018, Nash was given the Order of Manitoba, while in 2019 he was awarded the Meritorious Service Medal by Canadian Governor General Julie Payette.

Members
Robb Nash - Lead Vocals, Rhythm Guitar
Jonny Holliday - Drums
Anthony Anderson - Lead Guitar, Keys/Synth

References

External links
 Official Website
 Robb Nash on Facebook
 Robb Nash on YouTube
 Robb Nash on Twitter

Canadian alternative rock groups
Musical groups from Winnipeg
Musical groups with year of establishment missing
Motivational speakers
Mennonite musicians